Östra Valla is a city district in western Linköping. It includes Griftegård, the Valla wood, and a business park.
Östra Valla adjoins the districts West Valla, Gottfridsberg, Downtown, Djurgården, Ekkällan and Garnisonen.

Östra Valla lies near Downtown.

Geography of Linköping